Two human polls comprised the 1954 National Collegiate Athletic Association (NCAA) football rankings. Unlike most sports, college football's governing body, the NCAA, does not bestow a national championship, instead that title is bestowed by one or more different polling agencies. There are two main weekly polls that begin in the preseason—the AP Poll and the Coaches Poll.

Legend

AP Poll
The final AP Poll was released on November 29, at the end of the 1954 regular season, weeks before the major bowls. The AP would not release a post-bowl season final poll regularly until 1968.

Final Coaches Poll
The final UP Coaches Poll was released prior to the bowl games, on November 29.
UCLA received 21 of the 35 first-place votes; Ohio State received eleven, and one each to Oklahoma, Notre Dame, and Navy.

 The NCAA record book lists USC, Maryland, and Georgia Tech in a tie for 11th place, while contemporary sources list them in 11th, 12th, and 13th respectively.
 Prior to the 1975 season, the Big Ten and Pacific Coast (later AAWU / Pac-8) conferences allowed only one postseason participant each, for the Rose Bowl.

References

College football rankings